Aerick Rashal Sanders (born June 1, 1982) is a retired American professional basketball player and current assistant coach for the Kansas City Roos of the Summit League. Previously he was the former Director of Player Personnel at the University of Nevada, Las Vegas from 2017-2019. He was the former assistant coach of the New Mexico State men's basketball team during the 2013-2017 seasons. During his professional career as a player,  he played at the power forward position internationally, including as a member of the Strasbourg IG, Aliaga Petkim and Academia Coimbre basketball clubs respectively.

College career
Sanders was a standout basketball player at San Diego State. He was an All-Mountain West selection and team captain as a senior for the Aztecs. He averaged 16.1 points and 9.8 rebounds in his final season. Additionally, Sanders led Aztecs to the NCAA Tournament following a Mountain West Tournament Championship in 2002.

Professional career
After Sanders completed his career at San Diego State Aztecs men's basketball in 2004, he went on to play professionally overseas. Aerick played for six seasons with clubs such as Tuborg (Turkey), Ciudad de Huelva (Spain), Strasbourg (France), ASK Riga (Latvia), Aliaga (Turkey), Dijon (France), SPO Rouen (France) and Academica (Portugal) before a devastating knee injury ended his playing career.

Coaching career
Shortly after his professional career came to an end, Sanders began his own sports academy focused on helping players develop their skills on the court. The Sanders Sports Academy provided training for players at the professional level and aspiring basketball players at the grade school level.

Sanders spent the 2012-13 season as an assistant coach at Montana State. Aerick Sanders joined the New Mexico State Aggies men's basketball team as an assistant coach in June 2013.

References

External links 
 Euroleague.net Player Profile
 Lnb.fr Player Profile
 San Diego State Player Profile
 New Mexico State Coach Profile

1982 births
Living people
American expatriate basketball people in France
American expatriate basketball people in Israel
American expatriate basketball people in Latvia
American expatriate basketball people in Portugal
American expatriate basketball people in Spain
American expatriate basketball people in Turkey
ASK Riga players
Basketball coaches from California
Basketball players from California
JDA Dijon Basket players
Montana State Bobcats men's basketball coaches
New Mexico State Aggies men's basketball coaches
Power forwards (basketball)
San Diego State Aztecs men's basketball players
SIG Basket players
American men's basketball players